Nikolsk is a rural locality (a selo) in Vilegodsky District, Arkhangelsk Oblast, Russia. The population was 613 as of 2010. There are 16 streets.

Geography 
Nikolsk is located 26 km northwest of Ilyinsko-Podomskoye (the district's administrative centre) by road. Kochnegovskaya is the nearest rural locality.

References 

Rural localities in Vilegodsky District